Robyn Horsager-Boehrer is an American obstetrician and gynecologist, currently the Luis Leib, M.D. Professor in Obstetrics & Gynecology at University of Texas Southwestern Medical Center.

References

Year of birth missing (living people)
Living people
University of Texas faculty
American obstetricians
American gynecologists
University of Illinois alumni